San Casciano is a village in Tuscany, central Italy, administratively a frazione of the comune of Cascina, province of Pisa. At the time of the 2001 census its population was 249.

San Casciano is about 15 km from Pisa and 4 km from Cascina.

Main sights 
 Santi Ippolito e Cassiano

References 

Frazioni of the Province of Pisa